Tenkiller may refer to:

Tenkiller, Oklahoma  
Tenkiller Ferry Lake
Terror at Tenkiller
Tenkiller State Park